Mary Catherine Small Long (born Mary Catherine Small; February 7, 1924 – November 23, 2019) was an American politician who served as the U.S. representative for Louisiana's 8th congressional district, which she filled from 1985 to 1987, the remainder of the term left by the death of her husband, Gillis William Long. Until it was disbanded in 1993, the 8th district was based in Central Louisiana about Alexandria. She was the first female military veteran elected to Congress, having served as a WAVE in the United States Navy.

Early life and education 
Mary Catherine Small was born in Dayton, Ohio, and attended school in Camp Hill, Pennsylvania. She served as a hospital corpsman in the United States Navy during World War II. Long earned a B.A. degree from Louisiana State University in 1948.

Career 
Long served in the U.S. Navy as a pharmacist's mate.
Long became a staff assistant for Oregon senator Wayne Morse and Ohio Representative James G. Polk.

In January 1985, Long's husband died and left a vacancy in Louisiana 8th congressional district. In 1985, when Long announced her candidacy, some of the wives of other U.S. representatives came into the district to campaign on her behalf. Long won the special election, defeating candidates including Republican Clyde C. Holloway, a nurseryman from Forest Hill in southern Rapides Parish, and then State Representative Jock Scott of Alexandria, a Democrat who later switched parties.

In 1986, Long declined to seek a full term as congresswoman in the nonpartisan blanket primary. In another bid for the seat, Holloway narrowly prevailed in the general election even though the Eighth District was among the most historically Democratic in the nation.

In his autobiographical Peapatch Politics: The Earl Long Era in Louisiana Politics, former lieutenant governor and education superintendent William J. "Bill" Dodd, an astute observer of Louisiana politics for a half century, describes Cathy Long, who compiled a liberal voting record in Congress, as the "perfect political wife."

Personal life 
She married Gillis William Long in 1947. Long had two children, George Harrison Long (born October 13, 1954) and Janis Catherine Long (born March 25, 1957).

Death
Long died from complications of dementia at an assisted-living facility in Chevy Chase, Maryland on November 23, 2019, at age 95.

See also
Women in the United States House of Representatives
 Speedy Long

References

External links

1924 births
2019 deaths
20th-century American politicians
20th-century American women politicians
Democratic Party members of the United States House of Representatives from Louisiana
Female members of the United States House of Representatives
Catherine Small
Louisiana State University alumni
Military personnel from Dayton, Ohio
Deaths from dementia in Maryland
People from Chevy Chase, Maryland
People from Washington, D.C.
Politicians from Alexandria, Louisiana
Politicians from Dayton, Ohio
United States Navy sailors
WAVES personnel
Women in Louisiana politics